Phù Yên is a rural district of Sơn La province in the Northwest region of Vietnam. As of 2019, the district had a population of 114,974. The district covers an area of 1,227 km². The district capital lies at Phù Yên.

Administrative divisions
Phù Yên is divided into 27 commune-level sub-divisions, including the township of Phù Yên and 26 rural communes (Bắc Phong, Đá Đỏ, Gia Phù, Huy Bắc, Huy Hạ, Huy Tân, Huy Thượng, Huy Tường, Kim Bon, Mường Bang, Mường Cơi, Mường Do, Mường Lang, Mường Thải, Nam Phong, Quang Huy, Sập Xa, Suối Bau, Suối Tọ, Tân Lang, Tân Phong, Tường Hạ, Tường Phong, Tường Phù, Tường Thượng, Tường Tiến).

Places of Interest
The surrounding mountains are populated by H'mong families. One site of interest is the beautiful Suoi Chieu Lake a few kilometers north of the town.

References

Districts of Sơn La province
Sơn La province